Wayne Courtney Davis II (born August 22, 1991) is an American athlete, now representing Trinidad and Tobago, who specializes in the 110 metre hurdles. He currently holds the world youth record, world junior record and the US high school record in the 39" 110 m hurdles with a time of 13.08 seconds.  He is a graduate of Southeast Raleigh Magnet High School in Raleigh, North Carolina.

Career

Davis broke the World Youth 110 hurdles record (36") on July 12, 2007, at the 2007 World Youth Championships in Athletics in Ostrava, Czech Republic. Two years later, on July 31, 2009, he broke the World Junior 110 m hurdles record (39") at the 2009 Pan American Junior Athletics Championships in Port-of-Spain, Trinidad beating the previous mark of 13.12 seconds set by 2004 Olympic gold medalist Liu Xiang in 2002.  He competed at the 2014 Commonwealth Games.

Eligibility
Davis' parents are both natives of Trinidad and Tobago.  On August 4, 2011, Davis officially transferred his eligibility to compete for Trinidad and Tobago.  His sister Dannielle also competes internationally for Trinidad and Tobago.  As a member of the Trinidad and Tobago 2012 Olympic Team he finished sixth in his semi-final of the 110 metres hurdles.

References

External links

DyeStat profile for Wayne Davis
Texas A&M Aggies bio

1991 births
Living people
American sportspeople of Trinidad and Tobago descent
Track and field athletes from Raleigh, North Carolina
American male hurdlers
Trinidad and Tobago male hurdlers
Olympic athletes of Trinidad and Tobago
Athletes (track and field) at the 2012 Summer Olympics
Commonwealth Games competitors for Trinidad and Tobago
Athletes (track and field) at the 2014 Commonwealth Games
World Athletics Championships athletes for Trinidad and Tobago
Texas A&M Aggies men's track and field athletes